The Kavalan (endonym  ; "people living in the plain") or Kuvalan are an indigenous people of Taiwan. Most of them moved to the coastal area of Hualien County and Taitung County in the 19th century due to encroachment by Han settlers. Their language is also known as Kavalan. Currently, the largest settlement of Kavalan is Xinshe Village in Fengbin Township, Hualien County.

History

Legend has it that the Kavalan arrived by sea from the east and that when they saw the stunning beauty of this location, they decided then and there to settle this bountiful land. The newly arrived Kavalan fought many battles against the local Atayal people, and in the end the Kavalan drove the Atayal into the mountains — true to their name "Kavalan", which means "flatland people". That name subsequently morphed into "Hamalan", ultimately yielding the modern-day Yilan City. They were referred as 36 Kavalan tribes (蛤仔難三十六社), although there were more than 60. In the past, tribes north of the Lanyang River were called Sai-sè-hoan (西勢番) while those south of the river were Tang-sè-hoan (東勢番).

The earliest record of the Kavalan in history was in 1632, when a Spanish ship went astray to this area by a typhoon. More clear record came in 1650 by the Dutch East India Company (VOC). Han Chinese tried to settle in the area as early as 1768. However, settlement did not succeed until 1796, when  established the first village (now Toucheng). Eventually, many more Han Chinese entered this area and the life of Kavalan was forced to change. Many of them moved to Beipu Village (in Sincheng Township of Hualien County) between 1830 and 1840.

Karewan incident
In 1878, the Kavalan, and their Sakizaya allies, fought a devastating battle against Qing invaders after a dispute with Qing officials led to a local uprising. Others were displaced by Han settlers. The remaining Sakizaya, meanwhile, were forced to blend with other peoples, such as the Amis, with the intention of protecting their identity.

See also
 Kavalan language
 Yilan County
 Hualien County
 Plains indigenous peoples
 Taiwanese indigenous peoples
 Kavalan Distillery

Further reading
 Kuvalan Tribes page of the Taiwan Aboriginal Culture Park website.

References

Taiwanese indigenous peoples
Ethnic groups in Taiwan